Bushrod is an unincorporated community in Greene County, Indiana, in the United States.

History
Bushrod was founded in about 1889.

References

Unincorporated communities in Greene County, Indiana
Unincorporated communities in Indiana